The 2010 FIA WTCC Race of Portugal was the fifth round of the 2010 World Touring Car Championship season. It was the fourth running of the Race of Portugal, and the first time the series had visited the circuit. The race was held at the Autódromo Internacional do Algarve near Portimão in Portugal on 4 July 2010. The two races were won by Tiago Monteiro and Gabriele Tarquini of SR-Sport.

Background
Coming into the round, Chevrolet RML driver Yvan Muller was the leading the drivers' championship by 19 points. Sergio Hernández was leading the Yokohama Independents' Trophy by 16 points over Stefano D'Aste.

eBay Motors joined the grid with driver Colin Turkington for the first of three races, it marked Turkington's first race since he claimed the 2009 British Touring Car Championship drivers' title.

Report

Testing and free practice
Andy Priaulx set the fastest time in Friday's test session, with Chevrolet driver Robert Huff less than a tenth behind. Augusto Farfus was third, in the second BMW Team RBM car.

SEAT driver Jordi Gené was fastest in the first practice session on Saturday morning, Muller was the fastest Chevrolet driver in fifth and Priaulx was the fastest BMW in seventh. Turkington was the top Yokohama Trophy driver in ninth.

Farfus was quickest in the final practice session ahead of the leading SR-Sport car of Tom Coronel. Fourth placed Huff was the fastest Chevrolet driver while Turkington in tenth was once again the fastest independent driver.

Qualifying
At the start of Q1, Tiago Monteiro and Priaulx collided at Turn 12, both cars having to return to the pits to repair the damage. Upon returning to the track, Monteiro set the fastest time in the session. Reigning British Touring Car Champion Colin Turkington made it through to Q2 as the quickest Independent runner on his season debut. SEAT drivers Michel Nykjær, Fredy Barth and Tom Coronel were the biggest names not to make it through to Q2, in 11th, 14th and 15th places.

In Q2, all ten of the drivers waited until there were four minutes remaining of the ten-minute session before setting their first flying lap times. Monteiro was fastest again, 0.053 seconds ahead of Muller, Farfus, Tarquini and Huff.

Warm-Up
Priaulx was fastest in the Sunday morning warm–up session while pole sitter Monteiro was sixth.

Race One
Monteiro led comfortably away from pole position in the opening laps, as Muller and Tarquini fought for second place behind him. Further back, Priaulx slid off the road at the final turn as he battled with Barth. Having suffered a puncture and damaged bodywork, Priaulx spent much of the race in the pits repairing the damage. As Nykjær and Norbert Michelisz were fighting over seventh place, they forced each other wide, allowing Alain Menu and Coronel to pass them. Huff had been running fourth early on having passed Farfus, but went off the road, running over the gravel trap and into the wall. He was able to rejoin, but finished the race a lap down in 18th place. Gené stopped out on track while running in sixth position. Having dropped back early on from his tenth-place starting position, Turkington was fighting with Barth behind, when the two made contact, putting Turkington into a spin, this gave Hernández the Independents' lead. As the race reached its conclusion, Monteiro came under pressure for the lead from Muller, Tarquini and Farfus. However he managed to keep them at bay to record a popular and emotional home victory. Having fended off Coronel, Menu finished fifth, with Michelisz and Barth finishing seventh and eighth. Hernández took the Independent victory ahead of Darryl O'Young in ninth overall.

Race Two
Barth made a slow start away from pole position at the start of race two, dropping to eighth by the end of the first lap. Fellow front-row-starter Michelisz took the lead from Barth. Behind, Menu passed Coronel for second place, while Tarquini moved into fourth before passing Coronel for third. Further back, Turkington fell to the back of the pack after a spin, while fellow Independent BMW driver Kristian Poulsen retired having had a spin of his own.

On the second lap Barth lost five more places, while up front Menu began pushing Michelisz for the lead. Menu made his move at the beginning of lap four, with Tarquini also following him through before taking the lead from Menu. Michelisz meanwhile dropped out with a water pressure problem. Muller passed Coronel for third before passing his Chevrolet teammate Menu for second place.

On lap eight, Huff passed Monteiro and Coronel, before the BMW pair of Priaulx and Farfus also passed the two SEAT drivers. Two laps before the finish, Gené stopped once again due to a puncture. On the final lap, Huff passed Chevrolet teammate Menu for third position. Tarquini held on to take the victory ahead of Muller, Huff, Menu, Priaulx and Farfus. Coronel was seventh, ahead of Monteiro and Barth. O'Young took the final point in tenth and his first win in the Independents' Trophy. He had to hold off Turkington, who had recovered well from his early spin to pass Vaulkhard for 11th on the final lap.

After the race, Huff was given a 30-second penalty for an incident with Farfus, dropping him from third place to 15th. He was also given a reprimand for another incident with Farfus in the first race.

Results

Qualifying

Race 1

Bold denotes Fastest lap.

Race 2

Bold denotes Fastest lap.

 — Huff originally finished third, but was given a 30-second penalty after the race for causing a collision.

Standings after the event

Drivers' Championship standings

Yokohama Independents' Trophy standings

Manufacturers' Championship standings

 Note: Only the top five positions are included for both sets of drivers' standings.

References

Results Booklet PDF at MST Systems

External links
World Touring Car Championship official website

Portugal
FIA WTCC Race of Portugal
Sport in Portimão
Motorsport in Portugal